The 2008–09 Sri Lankan cricket season featured a Test series between Sri Lanka and India.

Honours
 P Saravanamuttu Trophy – Colts Cricket Club
 Hatna Trophy – Bloomfield Cricket and Athletic Club
 Most runs – AD Mathews 1038 @ 79.84 (HS 270)
 Most wickets – S Weerakoon 71 @ 20.35 (BB 7–40) and S Prasanna 71 @ 20.70 (BB 8–59)

Test series
Sri Lanka won the Test series against India by 2–1:
 1st Test @ Sinhalese Sports Club Ground, Colombo – Sri Lanka won by innings and 135 runs
 2nd Test @ Galle International Stadium, Galle – India won by 170 runs
 3rd Test @ Paikiasothy Saravanamuttu Stadium, Colombo – Sri Lanka won by 8 wickets

External sources
  CricInfo – brief history of Sri Lankan cricket
 CricketArchive – Tournaments in Sri Lanka

Further reading
 Wisden Cricketers' Almanack 2009

Sri Lankan cricket seasons from 2000–01